Horacio Pagani may refer to:

Horacio Pagani (auto executive) (born 1955), Argentinian founder of Pagani Automobili S.p.A.
Horacio Pagani (sportswriter) (born 1943), Argentine sportswriter and sportscaster